Betsy is an English feminine given name, often a nickname for Elizabeth.

People
Betsy, stage name of Welsh singer Elizabeth Humfrey 
Betsy Ancker-Johnson (1927–2020), American plasma physicist
Betsy Atkins (born 1953), American business executive and entrepreneur
Betsy Balcombe (1802−1871), English friend of Napoleon I at Saint Helena
Betsy Beard (born 1961), American coxswain
Betsy Beers (born 1957), American television and film producer
Betsy Beutler, American actress
Betsy Blair (1923–2009), American actress
Betsy Bobel, American dietitian and model
Betsy Boze, American academic and education administrator
Betsy Brown (born 1963), American poet
Betsy Bryan (born 1949), American Egyptologist
Betsy Butler (born 1963), American politician
Betsy Byars (1928–2020), American author
Betsy B. Carr (born 1946), American politician
Betsy or Betty Careless (c. 1704–1739), English courtesan
Betsy Clifford (born 1953), Canadian alpine skier
Betsy Close (born 1950), American politician
Betsy Cook, American-born singer, songwriter and musician
Betsy Mix Cowles (1810–1876), American abolitionist
Betsy Cullen (born 1938), American professional golfer
Betsy Devine (born 1946), American journalist
Betsy DeVos (born 1958), American businesswoman and politician
Betsy Robertson Eyre (1911–1983), New Zealand teacher, community worker and local politician
Betsy Fagin (born 1972), American poet
Betsy Freese, American editor, blogger, and radio personality
Betsy Gotbaum (born 1938), New York City Public Advocate
Betsy Hager (1750–1843), farmer and blacksmith during the American Revolution
Betsy Hands, American politician
Betsy Hassett (born 1990), New Zealand football player
Betsy Heard (1759–1810s), Euro‐African slave trader and merchant
Betsy Hodges (born 1969), mayor of Minneapolis
Betsy Holden (born 1955), American businesswoman
Betsy Jochum (born 1921), American baseball pitcher
Betsy Jolas (born 1926), French composer
Betsy Joslyn (born 1954), American actress and singer
Betsy King (born 1955), American golfer
Lizzie Lloyd King (born 1847), also known as Betsy King, alleged murderer of Charles Goodrich
Betsy Leondar-Wright (born 1956), economic justice activist, sociologist, and author
Betsy Lewin (born 1937), American illustrator
Betsy McCaughey (born 1948), American politician
Betsy McLaughlin (born 1960), American businesswoman
Betsy Flagg Melcher (1900–1991), American miniature portraitist
Betsy Nagelsen (born 1956), American former professional tennis player
Betsy Norden (born 1945), American soprano
Betsy Palmer (1926–2015), American actress
Betsy Pecanins (1954–2016), American-born Mexican singer, songwriter and record producer
Betsy Plank (1924–2010), American public relations executive
Betsy Rawls, American golfer
Betsy Repelius (1848–1921), Dutch painter and watercolorist who specialized in simple, one-figure, genre scenes
Betsy Graves Reyneau (1888–1964), American portrait painter
Betsy Rosenberg, American Radio host
Betsy Ross (1752–1836), American patriot credited with sewing the first American flag
Betsy Rue (born 1979), American actress
Betsy Ruth (born 1985), American wrestler, ring name Mary Kate
Betsy Rutherford (1944–1991), American singer
Betsy Saina (born 1988), Kenyan athlete
Betsy Schneider, American photographer
Betsy Smittle (died 2013), American musician, half-sister of Garth Brooks
Betsy Snite (1938–1984), American alpine ski racer
Betsy Sodaro (born 1984), American actress and comedian
Betsy Struxness, American actress, singer, and dancer
Betsy Weiss, lead singer of Bitch (band)

Dogs
Betsy (dog), an Austrian Border Collie credited with high intelligence

Fictional characters
Betsy, main character in the Betsy series of children's books by Carolyn Haywood
Betsy Bobbin, in the Oz books
Elizabeth "Betsy" Braddock, Marvel Comics superheroine also known as Psylocke and Captain Britain
Betsy Ray, protagonist of the Betsy-Tacy series of novels by Maud Hart Lovelace
Betsy Chernak Taylor, on the canceled American soap opera Love is a Many Splendored Thing
Betsy, an infected monkey in the film Outbreak
Elizabeth Ann, main character of the novel Understood Betsy by Dorothy Canfield Fisher

See also
Betsey (disambiguation)

English feminine given names
Hypocorisms